Bareh-ye Seyyed Ahmad (also Romanized as Bareh-ye Şeyyed Aḩmad and Bara Saiyid Ahmed; also known as Bareh-ye Seyyed Aḩmad-e Maḩakī and Bard-e Seyyed Aḩmad) is a village in Boluran Rural District, Darb-e Gonbad District, Kuhdasht County, Lorestan Province, Iran. At the 2006 census, its population was 123, in 22 families.

References 

Towns and villages in Kuhdasht County